(born Eikichi Watanabe, 28 May 1940 - 7 October 2020), was a Japanese composer, record producer and arranger.

Tsutsumi began his career as a songwriter about 1966, and he came to prominence as a composer of Ayumi Ishida's chart-topping hit "Blue Light Yokohama" in the late 1960s. He has released nearly 3,000 compositions to date, over 500 of which have entered the Japanese Oricon singles chart. Tsutsumi is the most commercially successful composer of the Japanese popular music of last five decades, selling over 76 million units on the country's singles chart from 1968 onwards.

Two of his compositions won the grand prix of Japan Record Award— "Mata Au Hi Made" performed by Kiyohiko Ozaki in 1971 and "Miserarete" by Judy Ongg in 1979.  Tsutsumi himself has also won the awards for best songwriting category five times. Recognized for his long-term contribution to establish Japanese popular music, Tsutsumi received the Medal of Honor with Purple Ribbon by the Government of Japan in November 2003.

Tsutsumi died of aspiration pneumonia on October 7, 2020, after home recuperation, at age 80.

Early life
 was born on May 28, 1940, in Ushigome, Tokyo City, now part of Shinjuku Ward. He was a student of Aoyama Gakuin, one of the most prestigious educational institutes in Japan. Watanabe learned piano when he was in kindergarten, and joined the college's jazz club in his teen years. After graduating from University, Watanabe worked as a director of Nippon Grammophon, a Japanese record label which later changed its name to Polydor Japan and is now owned by Universal Music Group. Tadataka Watanabe, his younger brother, became a record executive too, who has been chief producer of Warner Music Japan and well known as a discoverer of multi-million selling folk-rock duo Kobukuro.

Career
On the suggestion of a composer Jun Hashimoto, his senior graduate of university, Watanabe began his songwriting career under the pen name Kyohei Tsutsumi. "Kiiroi Lemon", his first recorded compositions co-written by Hashimoto and sung by then-unknown Masato Shimon (using stage name Kōichi Fuji), was issued as a single in 1966. However, it was initially released as a work composed by Kōichi Sugiyama, and Tsutsumi's name was not credited on the original pressing of the record.

Tsutsumi's first hit, "Barairo no Kumo", was performed by the Village Singers and released as a single in 1967. He rose to fame in 1969, after release of "Blue Light Yokohama" recorded by singer and actress Ayumi Ishida. It was released as a single on Christmas Day of 1968 and topped the Japanese Oricon sales chart in the following year, becoming the fifth record to have sold over 1 million copies since the chart started counting sales in 1968. As a composer of the song, Tsutsumi won the 11th Japan Record Awards for the best songwriting category on December 31, 1969.

In 2020, he became one of eight recipients of the Special Lifetime Achievement Award at the 62nd Japan Record Awards.

Selected discography

Studio albums
During the late 1960s and the 1970s, Tsutsumi released the following of his own albums. Most of those efforts were reissued in 2006, as part of compilation series entitled Kyohei Tsutsumi Solo Works Collection released by five different labels — EMI Music Japan, Sony Music Entertainment, King Records, Victor Entertainment, and Nippon Columbia.

Number-one hits on the Oricon singles chart

Compilation and tribute albums
 Various artists - Hit　Story: Kyohei Tsutsumi Ultimate Collection 1967-1997 Volume 1 (4-CD box set) (1997, Sony)
 Various artists - Hit　Story: Kyohei Tsutsumi Ultimate Collection 1967-1997 Volume 2 (4-CD box set) (1997, Sony)
 Various artists - Kyohei Tsutsumi Ultra Best Tracks / Soul & Disco (1998, Victor)
 Various artists - Kyohei Tsutsumi Ultra Best Tracks / 60's Rare Tracks (1998, Victor)
 Various artists - Kyohei Tsutsumi Ultra Best Tracks / 70's Collection (1998, Victor)
 Various artists - Kyohei Tsutsumi Ultra Best Tracks / 80's Girlie Pop (1998, Victor)
 Various artists - Kyohei Tsutsumi Ultra Best Tracks / Polygram Girls Pop (1998, New Taurus)
 Various artists - Kyohei Tsutsumi Ultra Best Tracks / Polygram GS and Guys (1998, New Taurus)
 Various artists - Kyohei Tsutsumi Ultra Best Tracks / Columbia Edition Vol.1 60's and 70's (1998, Nippon Columbia)
 Various artists - Kyohei Tsutsumi Ultra Best Tracks / GS and Rarities (1998, Toshiba EMI)
 Various artists - Kyohei Tsutsumi Ultra Best Tracks / Girls Pop 80's (1998, Toshiba EMI)
 Ayumi Ishida - Kyohei Tsutsumi Tracks　(2-CD) (1998, Nippon Columbia)
 Yukari Itō - Kyohei Tsutsumi Ultra Best Tracks (1998, Nippon Columbia)
 Goro Noguchi - Kyohei Tsutsumi Ultra Best Tracks (1998, New Taurus)
 Miki Hirayama - Kyohei Tsutsumi Ultra Best Tracks (1998, Nippon Columbia)
 Saori Minami - Golden Best: Cynthia Sings Kyohei Tsutsumi　(2-CD) (2002, Sony)
 Yukiji Asaoka - Golden Best: Sings Kyohei Tsutsumi (2002, Sony)
 Miki Hirayama - Golden Best: Sings Kyohei Tsutsumi and More (2003, Sony)
 Sumiko Sakamoto - Golden Best (2003, Sony)
 YuYa - Idol Miracle Bible Series: Sings Kyohei Tsutsumi and More (2003, Sony)
 Yū Hayami - Golden Best: Yu Hayami/Kyohei Tsutsumi Pops Best (2003, Universal)
 Various artists - The Hit Maker (6-CD box set) (2006, Sony)
 Various artists - Kyohei Disco Night: Kyohei Tsutsumi Remix (2007, Nippon Columbia)
 Various artists - Kyohei Tsutsumi Tribute: The Popular Music (2007, Universal)
 Chiyo Okumura - Chiyo Tsutsumi Kyohei o Utau (2010, HotWax/Solid)
 Yūko Asano - Golden Best Limited: Sings Kyohei Tsutsumi (2011, Sony)
 Hiroyuki Okita - Golden Best Limited: Sings Kyohei Tsutsumi (2011, Sony)
 Various artists - Mayonaka no Bossa Nova: Jun Hashimoto and Kyohei Tsutsumi Golden Album Around 1969 (2012, Nippon Columbia)

Further reading

References

External links
 

1940 births
2020 deaths
Japanese male composers
Japanese record producers
Musicians from Shinjuku
Recipients of the Medal with Purple Ribbon